Gastes is a commune in the Landes department in Nouvelle-Aquitaine in southwestern France. It is located in the Landes forest, between Mimizan and Biscarrosse.

Etymology 
The name of the commune, comes from Latin , which means an "empty/deserted land". It synonymous with French .

Population

References

See also
Communes of the Landes department

Communes of Landes (department)